{{DISPLAYTITLE:C18H12O6}}

The molecular formula C18H12O6 (molar mass: 324.28 g/mol, exact mass: 324.0634 u) may refer to:

 Atromentin
 Hexahydroxytriphenylene (HHTP)
 Sterigmatocystin

References

Molecular formulas